A ghillie suit is a type of camouflage clothing designed to resemble the background environment such as foliage, snow or sand. Typically, it is a net or cloth garment covered in loose strips of burlap (hessian), cloth, or twine, sometimes made to look like leaves and twigs, and optionally augmented with scraps of foliage from the area.

Military personnel, police, hunters, and nature photographers may wear a ghillie suit to blend into their surroundings and conceal themselves from enemies or targets. The suit gives the wearer's outline a three-dimensional breakup, rather than a linear one. When manufactured correctly, the suit will move in the wind in the same way as surrounding foliage. Some ghillie suits are made with light and breathable material that allows a person to wear a shirt underneath.

A well-made ghillie suit is extremely effective in camouflaging its wearer. A ghillie-suited soldier sitting perfectly still with local flora attached to their webbing is nearly impossible to detect visually, even at close range. However the suit does nothing to prevent thermal detection using technologies such as forward-looking infrared cameras. In fact, the warmth of the heavy suit can make a wearer stand out more than a standard soldier when viewed using these methods.

History 
The English word "ghillie" is derived from the Scots Gaelic gille, meaning a young man or older boy who works as an outdoor servant, and is most familiar in reference to those employed to assist sportsmen with recreational shooting or fishing in the Highlands. The term "ghillie suit" may be a reference to the Ghillie Dhu (English: black-haired youth or dark-haired lad), an earth spirit clothed in leaves and moss in Scottish mythology.

The Lovat Scouts, a Scottish Highland regiment formed by Simon Fraser, 14th Lord Lovat during the Second Boer War, is the first known military unit to use ghillie suits and in 1916 went on to become the British Army's first sniper unit. The Lovat Scouts were initially recruited from Scottish Highland estate workers, especially professional stalkers and gamekeepers.

Similar sniper outfits in the Australian Army are nicknamed "yowie suit", named for their resemblance to the yowie, a mythical hominid similar to the yeti and bigfoot which is said to live in the Australian wilderness.

Technical and safety considerations
Although highly effective, conventional ghillie suits (made in fabric or 3D leafsuits) are impractical for many situations where camouflage is useful. They tend to be very heavy and hot. The burlap is also flammable, unless treated with fire retardant, so the wearer may be at increased risk from ignition sources such as smoke grenades or white phosphorus. Moreover, conventional ghillie suits and 3D leafsuits are made using fabric, so they retain water, and this dramatically increases weight. Conventional ghillie suits are not designed to camouflage in the IR spectrum, so they are highly detectable using night vision devices. Fabric strips, especially of coarse material like burlap, readily snag on thorns, twigs, and barb wire.

To enhance safety, the US Army Soldier Systems Center has developed an inherently fire-resistant, self extinguishing fabric to replace jute or burlap. This material was field tested in late 2007 at the Sniper School at Fort Benning and has been standard issue since June 2008.

There are also increased risks associated with wearing a ghillie suit in cold environments, as ghillie suits absorb water and trap it against the body, in some cases resulting in hypothermia.

Criminal use 
Civilians have, on rare occasions, purchased ghillie suits to commit crimes (other than unlawful hunting). Police arrested an Australian man after they found that he had assaulted women while wearing such a suit.

In 2021, a man tried to cross state lines to South Australia from Victoria wearing some sort of ghillie suit and was arrested. Because of the COVID-19 pandemic, the government wanted people to go through checkpoints to pass through another region of Australia.

References

Further reading 

 Kevin Dockery: Stalkers and Shooters: A History of Snipers. Penguin, 2007, .
 Martin Pegler: Out of Nowhere: A History of the Military Sniper. Osprey Publishing, 2004, .

External links 
 

Military camouflage
Sniper warfare tactics
Scottish inventions
Scottish clothing